is a passenger railway station in located in the city of Izumisano, Osaka Prefecture, Japan, operated by West Japan Railway Company (JR West).

Lines

Station layout
The station consists of two opposed side platforms connected to the station building by a footbridge. The station is staffed.

Platforms

History
It was renamed to its present name on 1 May 1944. With the privatization of the Japan National Railways (JNR) on 1 April 1987, the station came under the aegis of the West Japan Railway Company.

Station numbering was introduced in March 2018 with Higashi-Sano being assigned station number JR-R43.

Passenger statistics
In fiscal 2019, the station was used by an average of 1278 passengers daily (boarding passengers only).

Surrounding area
 Izumigaoka residential area

See also
List of railway stations in Japan

References

External links

 Higashi-Sano Station Official Site

Railway stations in Osaka Prefecture
Railway stations in Japan opened in 1939
Izumisano